Kstovo is the name of several inhabited localities in Russia.

Urban localities
Kstovo, a town in Kstovsky District of Nizhny Novgorod Oblast; administratively incorporated as a town of district significance

Rural localities
Kstovo, Arkhangelsk Oblast, a village in Moshinsky Selsoviet of Nyandomsky District of Arkhangelsk Oblast
Kstovo, Kostroma Oblast, a village in Kotovskoye Settlement of Kostromskoy District of Kostroma Oblast
Kstovo, Pskov Oblast, a village in Pustoshkinsky District of Pskov Oblast
Kstovo, Vologda Oblast, a village in Soshnevsky Selsoviet of Ustyuzhensky District of Vologda Oblast
Kstovo, Nekrasovsky District, Yaroslavl Oblast, a village in Nikolsky Rural Okrug of Nekrasovsky District of Yaroslavl Oblast
Kstovo, Rybinsky District, Yaroslavl Oblast, a settlement in Pokrovsky Rural Okrug of Rybinsky District of Yaroslavl Oblast

References